POL/AE Maroni was a Cypriot football club based in Maroni, Cyprus. They were played 1 season in Cypriot Third Division and 1 season in Fourth Division. They dissolved at 2012.

References

Football clubs in Cyprus
Football clubs in Larnaca
Association football clubs established in 2008
2008 establishments in Cyprus